Asbru may refer to:
A bridge in Norse mythology also called Bifrost
 Asbru (area), a university and entrepreneur area next to the Keflavik International Airport in Reykjanesbaer, Iceland